The Siam Weekly Advertiser was an English-language newspaper published in Thailand that was founded in 1869 by British missionary Samuel J. Smith. Its first issue was published on 26 August 1869. It ceased publication on 7 August 1886.

See also 
 Timeline of English-language newspapers published in Thailand
 List of online newspaper archives - Thailand

References

External links 
 

Defunct newspapers published in Thailand
English-language newspapers published in Asia
English-language newspapers published in Thailand
Mass media in Bangkok